Realm of Wonders is the demo by Fairyland, released in 2000 while the band was still under the name of Fantasia.

Track listing
All tracks written by Philippe Giordana, Willdric Lievin, and Thomas Caesar.
 "The Realm" - 1:13
 "Ride with the Sun" - 5:05
 "Doryan" - 0:43
 "The Enlightened" - 4:54
 "The King" - 2:06
 "Holy Quest" - 6:29
 "On the Path to Fury" - 5:08
 "Lake of Tears" - 1:49
 "Fight for Your King" - 6:14
 "Cruel Death" - 4:51
 "The Fellowship" - 6:13
 "Lord" - 6:05
 "The Army of the White Mountains" - 6:00
 "Song for a Victory" - 4:22

References

External links
 - Official Fairyland Website
 - Free and Legal download of the demo

Fairyland (band) albums
2000 albums